Phillip Carter may refer to:
Phil Carter (born 1975), deputy assistant secretary of defense for detainee affairs
Phillip Carter (businessman) (1962–2007), founder of Carter & Carter
Phillip Carter (ambassador) (born 1959), U.S. ambassador to Côte d'Ivoire
Phil Carter (Canadian football) (born 1959), CFL player

See also
Philip Carter (1927–2015), businessman